The Mentari BRT station is located in Bandar Sunway, Petaling Jaya, Selangor, and is served by the BRT Sunway Line. Like other BRT stations on the line, this BRT station is elevated.

The station is surrounded by shoplots and apartments, and serves the Sunway Mentari commercial area.

References 

Bus rapid transit in Malaysia
Buildings and structures in Selangor
2015 establishments in Malaysia